Hranča is a village in the Municipality of Bratunac, Bosnia and Herzegovina.

History

During the Bosnian War, in May 1992, 12 Bosniak civilians were killed in the village by Bosnian Serb forces. 

In July 1992, 20 Serbs, including 7 civilians were killed by Bosniak troops.

References

Populated places in Bratunac